John Zak Woodcock, Baron Walney (born 14 October 1978) is a British politician and life peer who served as Member of Parliament (MP) for Barrow and Furness from 2010 to 2019.

He has sat as a crossbencher in the House of Lords since 2021, previously sitting as a non-affiliated peer, and was a member of the Labour Party and Co-operative Party until 2018. A member of a parliamentary group named The Independents towards the end of his term in the House of Commons, he endorsed the Conservatives at the 2019 general election.

Prior to his election to Parliament, Woodcock was a political adviser who worked as an aide to Prime Minister Gordon Brown. He served as a Shadow Transport Minister from 2010 to 2013 under opposition leader Ed Miliband, and briefly as a Shadow Education Minister in 2015 under Harriet Harman. Woodcock was appointed to the Lords in 2020, and became an Independent Adviser on Political Violence and Disruption to the UK Government later in the same year. Prime Minister Boris Johnson appointed him as UK Trade Envoy to Tanzania in 2021.

Early life and career
Woodcock was born in Sheffield to parents who were teachers, his mother at Rotherham College of Arts and Technology. His father was a Labour councillor. He was educated at Tapton School and the University of Edinburgh. While studying for his degree, he took time out to work as a journalist on The Scotsman, before returning to the university to complete his English and history degree.

Woodcock was elected to run the London branch of Labour Students, and then worked for the Labour Party on the 2005 general election campaign. He later worked as an aide to John Hutton from 2005 to 2008 and later as Special Adviser to Prime Minister Gordon Brown.

Parliamentary career

House of Commons 
Woodcock was elected to the House of Commons as Member of Parliament for Barrow and Furness in the 2010 general election with a majority of 5,208. He succeeded John Hutton, the constituency's Labour MP since 1992.

On 10 October 2010, only five months after being elected to Parliament, he was named a Shadow Minister for Transport. He stepped down from this post for health reasons following an accident in January 2013. In May 2015, Woodcock was appointed Shadow Minister for Young People, but resigned in September 2015, following the election of Jeremy Corbyn as party leader.

From July 2011 to January 2013, Woodcock was Chair of Labour Friends of Israel. Until 2015, Woodcock was the chair of Progress, a ginger group within the Labour Party, promoting Blairite policies within the party.

Woodcock was a vocal critic of Jeremy Corbyn's leadership, joking about what he saw as a desperate situation at the 2015 Labour Party conference. In March 2016, Woodcock wrote an article for the Daily Mirror critical of Corbyn, which resulted in a backlash against him. Shortly after the announcement of the 2017 general election, Woodcock said he "will not countenance" voting to place Corbyn into Downing Street because of the Labour leader's opposition to the "Trident renewal programme".

In 2016, Woodcock supported the Saudi Arabian-led intervention in Yemen against the Shia Houthis. He met the king of Saudi Arabia, King Salman, in the Saudi capital of Riyadh, in his role as chair of Labour's backbench foreign affairs committee in 2018.

On 16 January 2019, Woodcock abstained in the vote of confidence in Theresa May's Conservative government, saying Corbyn was "unfit to lead the country". On 4 November, he announced he would not be re-standing as an MP in the 2019 general election, due to his partner Isabel Hardman's pregnancy. On 5 November, the government announced it would be appointing him special envoy for countering far-right violent extremism. He stated he would be supporting the Conservative Party in the upcoming election, and urged voters to vote Conservative.

Sexual harassment allegation 
In November 2017, a former staff member of Woodcock's complained to the Labour Party that he had sent her inappropriate text messages between 2014 and 2016. She reportedly asked for the case to be kept private, but the following year, details were leaked to two newspapers and on 30 April 2018 Woodcock was suspended from membership of the Labour Party and had the party whip withdrawn. "I do not accept the charge", Woodcock responded.

On 24 June 2018, Woodcock said he would no longer cooperate with the Labour Party investigation, as he believed it to be politically motivated. Woodcock stated that he would take the General Secretary of the Labour Party to court to force an independent inquiry to take place. A subject access request by the MP to the party found emails in which officials discussed the need to 'deal with Woodcock' in the run-up to the 2017 election, during which he stated that he would refuse to vote for his party's leader to become British Prime Minister in the event of a Labour victory, citing another case where an MP had been accused of sexual impropriety as an example of how the party could refuse to endorse a candidate. A senior party figure told The Guardian newspaper that: "There was always a group of people in the leader's office who wanted to hang a couple of our MPs on the right wing of the party out to dry, but wiser heads always prevailed." They added: "They were really, really going for him".

Labour Party resignation 
On 18 July 2018, Woodcock resigned from the Labour Party, choosing to sit as an Independent MP for the remainder of the term. He said that he believed that the party was "no longer the broad church it has always been", but had instead been "taken over by the hard left" under Corbyn's leadership. Woodcock further called Corbyn "a clear risk to UK national security", and criticised what he saw as the party's tacit endorsement of antisemitism and its failure to provide an independent investigator to rule on his disciplinary case, which he claimed was being "manipulated for factional purposes" within the party. Labour rejected all accusations of bias against Woodcock, arguing that the process is the same for all similar cases. He has since claimed that he pressed Parliament's independent grievance system to accept non-recent complaints so that his case could be heard.

Woodcock sat as an Independent MP, before joining a loose grouping of pro-European MPs known as The Independents in July 2019.

House of Lords 
Woodcock was nominated for a life peerage in the 2019 Dissolution Honours, and created Baron Walney, of the Isle of Walney in the County of Cumbria in September 2020. He was nominated alongside four other former Labour MPs who had backed Prime Minister Boris Johnson's Brexit deal and/or endorsed his party at the 2019 general election. He sat as a non-affiliated peer from September 2020 until October 2021, when he became a crossbencher.

Woodcock was appointed by the UK Government as an Independent Adviser on Political Violence and Disruption in November 2020. In the unpaid role, he was commissioned to conduct a review on the subject matter and present it to the Prime Minister and Home Secretary prior to publication. Johnson also appointed him as the UK's Trade Envoy to Tanzania in August 2021.

Other work 
In April 2020, Woodcock was named as part of a consortium, led by Robbie Gibb and including William Shawcross and John Ware, that put in a bid to purchase the assets of The Jewish Chronicle. The Jewish Chronicle chairman Alan Jacobs criticised the offer's anonymity, saying "A bid for the Jewish Chronicle using money from an unidentified source and fronted by a group of individuals who refuse to tell the world anything of their plans looks like a shameful attempt to hijack the world's oldest Jewish newspaper." The bid was successful.

Personal life
Woodcock was married to Mandy Telford, former President of the National Union of Students. They have two daughters. The couple separated in late 2014.

Woodcock began a relationship with the journalist Isabel Hardman in summer 2016. In November 2019, Woodcock announced Hardman was pregnant; she gave birth to their son on 12 May 2020. The couple married on 30 July 2021 in a small ceremony at Barrow-in-Furness's registry office.

References

External links

John Woodcock website

1978 births
Living people
Alumni of the University of Edinburgh
Woodcock, John
Woodcock, John
Woodcock, John
Labour Friends of Israel
Life peers
People educated at Tapton School
Politicians from Sheffield
The Scotsman people
Woodcock, John
Woodcock, John
Woodcock, John
Life peers created by Elizabeth II